The Montreal Roadrunners played from 1994 to 1997 in the Roller Hockey International. Their home games were at the Montreal Forum (1994–1996) and the Molson Centre (1996–1997).  They were finalists for the Murphy Cup in 1995.

Former Montreal Canadiens Hall of Famer Yvan Cournoyer led the team and gave it his own nickname, feeling that roller hockey matched his former playing style.

Alumni who also played in the NHL
Francis Bouillon
Daniel Gauthier
Stephane Charbonneau
Mario Doyon
Patrice Lefebvre
Eric Messier
Corrado Micalef

Season-by-season record

References

 
Road
Roller Hockey International teams
Sports clubs established in 1994
Sports clubs disestablished in 1997
1994 establishments in Quebec
1997 disestablishments in Quebec